Tórtoles de la Sierra is a village and municipality located in the Comarca de El Barco de Ávila - Piedrahíta comarca, province of Ávila, in Castile and León, Spain. According to the 2006 census (INE), the municipality has a population of 100 inhabitants.

References

Municipalities in the Province of Ávila